Sir Gordon Smith Grieve Beveridge  (28 November 1933  – 28 August 1999) was a Scottish chemist. He served as President and Vice-Chancellor of Queen's University of Belfast, Northern Ireland, from 1986 to 1997. He was knighted in 1994 for his services to higher education and died in Belfast.

Career 

Sir Gordon was born in St Andrews, Fife and brought up in Inverness. He attended Inverness Royal Academy, followed by the University of Glasgow, where he studied Engineering. He had a distinguished career and completed his PhD at the University of Edinburgh. He spent some time at the University of Minnesota as a Harkness Fellow and a visiting professor at the University of Texas. In 1967, he moved to Heriot-Watt University in Edinburgh, and, from 1971 to 1986, was Professor of Chemical Engineering and Head of the Department of the Chemical and Process Engineering at the University of Strathclyde in Glasgow.

Among his many posts, he was a Fellow and an Officer of the Royal Academy of Engineering, a Fellow of the Royal Society of Edinburgh, a Fellow of the Royal Society of Arts, a member of the Royal Irish Academy and a Companion of the Institute of Management.

In 1981, he was a founder member of the Engineering Council, serving 13 years first as Chairman of its Standing Committee on Professional Institutions and later as chairman of its standing committee on the Regions and Assembly. He was also a member of the National Economic Development Office (Nedo) Chemicals Economic Development Committee and chairman of its Petrochemical Sector Working Group.

In 1984, he served a term as president of the Institution of Chemical Engineers. He was President of QUA in 1989. He was Chairman of the Governments Radioactive Waste Management Advisory Committee (RWMAC) 1995-98, a member of the Board of the Northern Ireland Growth Challenge and a Director of University Bookshop Ltd, the Northern Quality Centre and the Northern Ireland Economic Research Centre. 

He also served as a member of the Council of the Open University, as Director and Chairman of Navan at Armagh Management Ltd, which runs the Navan Fort complex; Textflow Services Ltd, QUBIS Ltd (1991–97) and Lennoxvale Developments Ltd.

Family
Gordon was the son of Victor Beattie Beveridge and Elizabeth (Fairbairn) Grieve. He married Geertruida Hillegonda Johanna Bruijn  in 1963.

Publications 
He wrote more than 300 articles, papers and books, including Optimization: Theory and Practice (with Robert S. Schechter, published by McGraw-Hill Book Company Inc. New York, 1970).

Exhibitions 
 Engineering in the 80s, Edinburgh. Targeted at school leavers who were considering one of the branches of engineering as a career, this exhibition for the Council of Engineering Institutions was held at the Royal Museum of Scotland for three months. Exhibits ranged from coalface-cutting machines to needles for optical surgery.

Honorary degrees 
University of Dublin, Ireland
Connecticut College, USA
1995 Lodz University of Technology, Poland
Royal Irish Academy, Ireland
1985            University of Ulster, Northern Ireland
1994    DSc     Queen's University of Kingston, Canada
1995    Dsc     Queens University of Kingston, Canada
1995    LLD     University of Ireland
1995    LLD     University of Limerick
1997/98 DUniv   Heriot-Watt University, Edinburgh 
1998    LLD     Queen's University of Belfast, Belfast

References

External links
House of Commons appointment to RWMAC

1933 births
1999 deaths
People from St Andrews
People educated at Inverness Royal Academy
Alumni of the University of Glasgow
Alumni of the University of Edinburgh
Fellows of the Royal Society of Edinburgh
Fellows of the Royal Academy of Engineering
Knights Bachelor
Members of the Royal Irish Academy
Academics of the University of Edinburgh
University of Minnesota faculty
University of Texas faculty
Academics of Heriot-Watt University
Academics of the University of Strathclyde
People associated with the Open University
British chemical engineers
Scottish chemists
Scottish knights
Beveridge, Sir Gordon
Vice-Chancellors of Queen's University Belfast